Street Angel or Street Angels may refer to:

 Street Angel (1928 film), a silent film
 Street Angel (1937 film), a Chinese film
 Street Angels (1996 film), a Hong Kong film
 Street Angel (comics), an alternative comic series
 Street Angel (album), a 1994 album by Stevie Nicks
 Street Angel (soundtrack), a 2009 film soundtrack by Benjamin Speed
 "Street Angel", a song by Paul Simon from his album Stranger to Stranger